The Lahore High Court is based in Lahore, Pakistan. It was established as a high court on 21 March 1882. The Lahore High Court has jurisdiction over Punjab (Pakistan). The High Court's principal seat is in Lahore, but there are benches in three other Pakistani cities: Rawalpindi, Multan and Bahawalpur. A proposal was sent by lawyers to set up new high court benches in Faisalabad, Sialkot, D.G.Khan and Gujranwala divisions but full court of Lahore High Court turned down this request.

History

Creation
In 1849, the East India Company defeated the Sikh Empire and assumed control of administration within the Punjab. A Board of Administration was constituted and the Punjab  was divided into Divisions, Districts and Tehsils. The Divisions were controlled by Commissioners, Districts by Deputy Commissioners and Tehsils by an Assistant and Extra Assistant Commissioners.

The Board of Administration consisted of Sir Henry Lawrence, John Lawrence and Charles Grenville Mansel

Chief Court of the Punjab Lahore High Court 

In 1858 the Punjab, along with the rest of British India, came under the direct rule of the British crown  and decisions with regard to administration and justice were now made under the authority of the monarch, Queen Victoria. By 1864, a proliferation of court cases necessitated an expansion to the judicial structure in the province. The Punjab Courts Act, (XIX of 1865) introduced seven grades of courts, combining judicial and administrative functions and claiming jurisdiction over civil and criminal cases. The Court of Tehsildar was the lowest court, whilst the Court of the Judicial Commissioner became the highest court in the land.

Over time, as appeals to the Chief Court greatly increased, later Acts namely the Punjab Courts Act, (XVII of 1877) and Punjab Courts Act, (XVIII of 1884) repealed earlier Acts and restated the law regarding the courts' constitution, powers and jurisdiction. Additional judges were appointed, and greater finality was granted to the decisions of the lower appellate courts. By 1884, there were four classes of courts subordinate to the Chief Court, namely the Divisional Court, the Court of the District Judge, the Court of the Subordinate Judge, the Court of Munsif.

Lahore High Court
On October 1, 1882, the Chief Court of the Punjab Court was elevated to the status of a Lahore High Court, becoming known as Lahore High Court, King-Emperor George V also appointed a Chief Justice  and six puisne justices, and declared the Court's jurisdiction over the Punjab and Delhi  provinces.

The Government of India Act, 1935 removed the barrier that the Chief Justice must be a Barrister Judge and opened the position to Civilian Judges. An age limit of 60 years was set for High Court Judges.

By virtue of the Government of India (High Court Judges) Order, 1937, a maximum number of Judges for the various High Courts in India was fixed. In each case the number so stated was exclusive of the Chief Justice but included all additional judges. For the Lahore High Court the maximum number was fixed at 15.

The West Pakistan High Court
On 30 September 1955, the Constituent Assembly of Pakistan established the province of West Pakistan, and gave the Governor-General the power to establish the West Pakistan High Court, which was established in 1956. Judges from the Chief Court of Sind and the Judicial Commissioners Court at Peshawar  became judges  at the West Pakistan  High Court.

Creation Of Divisional Benches
On 1 January 1981, it was ordered that the Lahore High Court  would create benches at Bahawalpur, Multan and Rawalpindi. The order also specified that the Lahore High Court judges  could hold circuit courts anywhere in the province, with judges nominated by the Lahore High Court  Chief Justice.

Chief Justices
The first Chief Justice at Lahore was Sir Henry Meredyth Plowden in 1880.  The current Chief Justice is Muhammad Ameer Bhatti, incumbent since 6th July 2021 and will be retired on 7th March 2024.

List of chief justices
The following table lists all the chief justices to date.

Current composition
Lahore High Court is headed by a Chief Justice. The bench consist of sixty Justices and additional judges. The retirement age of Chief Justice and Justices is 62 years. The Additional Judges are initially appointed for one year. After that, their services could either be extended or they could be confirmed or they are retired. The current Chief Justice of Lahore High Court is Justice Muhammad Ameer Bhatti and Court is currently made up of the following Justices (in order of seniority).

PCO 25 March 1981
The PCO of 1981 also afforded the Lahore High Court these three benches. The judges were required to take oath under the Provisional Constitutional Order. Four judges refused to do so and were relieved of office. Four other judges were not administered the oath, and were also relieved of office.

PCO 26 January 2000
	Sir Rashid Aziz Khan	Took oath under PCO
	Mian Allah Nawaz	Took oath under PCO
	Falak Sher 	Took oath under PCO
	Ehsanul Haq Chaudhry	Did not Take oath under PCO
	Tanvir Ahmad Khan	Took oath under PCO
	Amir Alam Khan	Took oath under PCO
	Iftikhar Hussain Chaudhry	Took oath under PCO
	Fakhar-un-Nisa Khokhar	Took oath under PCO
	Ghulam Mehmood Qureshi	Took oath under PCO
	Karamat Nazir Bhandari	Took oath under PCO
	Javed Buttar	Took oath under PCO
	Mohammad Asif Jan	Took oath under PCO
	Mohammad Nasim Chaudhri	Took oath under PCO
	Mohammad Nawaz Abbasi,	Took oath under PCO
	Tassadaq Hussain Jilani	Took oath under PCO
	Raja Mohammad Sabir	Took oath under PCO
	Sayed Zahid Hussain  	Took oath under PCO
	Munir Ahmad Mughal	Took oath under PCO
	Fakir Mohammad Khokar	Took oath under PCO
	Abdul Razzaq Sheikh	Took oath under PCO
	Zafar Pasha Chaudhary	Took oath under PCO
	Mumtaz Ali Mirza 	Took oath under PCO
	Asif Saeed Khan Khosa 	Took oath under PCO
	Ch. Ijaz Ahmad	Took oath under PCO
	Iftikhar Ahmad Cheema	Took oath under PCO
	Jawad S Khawaja	Took oath under PCO
	Khwaja Mohammad Sharif	Took oath under PCO
	Mian Mohammad Najam-uz-Zaman	Took oath under PCO
	Mian Saqib Nisar	Took oath under PCO
	Mian Zafar Yasin	Took oath under PCO
	Riaz Kayani	Took oath under PCO
	Najamul Hassan Kazmi	Did not Take oath under PCO
	Syed Jamshed Ali	Took oath under PCO
	Khalil-ur-Rehman Ramday	Took oath under PCO
	Malik Mohammad Qayyum	Took oath under PCO
	Nazir Akhtar	Took oath under PCO
	Ali Nawaz Chohan	Took oath under PCO
	Bashir A Mujahid	Took oath under PCO
	Naeemullah Sherwani	Took oath under PCO
	Molvi Anwar-ul-Haq	Took oath under PCO
	Akhtar Shabbir	Took oath under PCO
	Naseem Sikandar	Took oath under PCO
	Nazir Siddique	Took oath under PCO

PCO 3 November 2007
Iftikhar Hussain Ch		Take oath under PCo as chief justice
Khawja Muhammad Sharif 		Refused oath under PCo
Sayyed Zahid Hussain 		Take oath under PCo
Mian M Najamuz Zaman		Take oath under PCo
Mian Saqib Nisar		Refused oath under PCo
Asif Saeed Khan Khosa		Refused oath under PCo
Maulvi Anwarul Haq		Take oath under PCo
Nasim Sikandar			Take oath under PCo
Abdul Shakoor Paracha		Take oath under PCo
Mohammad Khalid Alvi		Take oath under PCo
Muhammad Sair Ali		Refused oath under PCo
Ijaz Ahmad Chaudhry,		Refused oath under PCo
Mian Hamid Farooq		Take oath under PCo
M. Bilal Khan			Take oath under PCo
Fazale Miran Chauhan		Take oath under PCo
Syed Shabbar Raza Rizvi	Take oath under PCo
M. A. Shahid Siddiqui		Refused oath under PCo
Syed Sakhi Hussain Bokhari	Take oath under PCo
Sardar Mohammad Aslam		Take oath under PCo
Sheikh Hakim Ali		Take oath under PCo
Mohammad Muzammal Khan		Take oath under PCo
Muhammad Jhangir Arshad	Refused oath under PCo
Sh. Azmat Saeed		Refused oath under PCo
Syed Hamid Ali Shah		Take oath under PCo
Umar AttaBandial		Refused oath under PCo
Sh. Javaid Sarfraz		Take oath under PCo
Syed Sajjad Hussain Shah	Take oath under PCo
Tariq Shamim			Take oath under PCo
Syed Asghar Haider		Take oath under PCo
Hasnat Ahmad Khan		Take oath under PCo
Iqbal Hameed-ur-Rehman		Refused oath under PCo

See also
 Supreme Court of Pakistan
 High Courts of Pakistan
 Islamabad High Court
 Balochistan High Court
 Peshawar High Court
 Sindh High Court
 Court system of Pakistan
 Supreme Court Bar Association of Pakistan 
 Punjab Bar Council
 Punjab Judicial Academy

References

 
High Courts of Pakistan
Court system of Pakistan
Lahore
The Mall, Lahore